Facundo Daffonchio is an Argentine footballer who plays as a goalkeeper.

External links

References

1990 births
Living people
Footballers from Buenos Aires
Association football goalkeepers
Argentine footballers
Club Atlético Independiente footballers
Atlético Tucumán footballers
Club Atlético Sarmiento footballers